The Hang Seng University of Hong Kong (HSUHK) is a self-financing university in Hong Kong located in Siu Lek Yuen, Sha Tin, New Territories. It was founded as Hang Seng Management College in 2010 by the Hang Seng School of Commerce and was granted university title in 2018. It ranked #550-600 in QS university ranking for Asian in 2023.

History
Hang Seng Management College (HSMC) was founded in 2010 by the Hang Seng School of Commerce, in response to Chief Executive Donald Tsang's statement in his 2009 policy address that the self-financing higher education sector had room for expansion and was an important component of education services. In May 2010, the college was registered as an 'Approved Post Secondary College', and was approved to award degrees by the Chief Executive in Council.

In September 2010, the college began to offer its first three bachelor's degree with honours programmes, together with associate and pre-associate degree programmes originally offered by HSSC. The inauguration ceremony of the college was held on 28 January 2011.

In June 2011, the college announced the foundation of the School of Communication. Professor Scarlet Cho was the first dean of the school. Starting from year 2011/12, the college stopped offering the Pre-associate Degree in Business Administrations programme.

In November and December 2013, HSMC obtained accreditation from the Hong Kong Council for Accreditation of Academic and Vocational Qualifications for the following five programmes and was approved by the Education Bureau to offer degree programmes.

Bachelor of Business Administration in Financial Analysis (Honours)
Bachelor of Management Science and Information Management (Honours)
Bachelor of Business Administration (Honours) in Corporate Governance
Bachelor of Business Administration (Honours) in Management
Bachelor of Science (Honours) in Data Science and Business Intelligence

On 30 October 2018, the Chief Executive-in-Council approved the retitling of Hang Seng Management College into a university under Section 8(1) of the Post Secondary Colleges Ordinance, following an institutional review by the HKCAAVQ. The Hang Seng University of Hong Kong would be the city's 11th degree-awarding institution classified as a university, and its second private university after the Hong Kong Shue Yan University.

Acquiring University Status 
The Chief Executive in Council approved the university status of Hang Seng Management College (HSMC) on 30 October 2018. The HSMC is the first self-financing post-secondary education institution to acquire a university title since the publication of the revised roadmap of criteria for acquiring university title for post-secondary colleges registered under the Ordinance in 2015.

Academics

Schools and Departments 
The Hang Seng University of Hong Kong consists of five schools.

School of Business
Department of Accountancy
Department of Economics and Finance
Department of Management
Department of Marketing
School of Communication
School of Decision Sciences
Department of Computing
Department of Mathematics and Statistics
Department of Supply Chain and Information Management
School of Humanities and Social Science
Department of Chinese
Department of English
Department of Social Science
School of Translation

Curriculum and Programmes 
Undergraduate Programmes

 BBA (Honours) Economics
 Actuarial Studies and Insurance
 Applied Computing
 Asian Studies
 Business Administration (For Senior-Year Entry Only)
 Finance and Banking
 Global Business Management
 Marketing
 Professional Accountancy
 Cultural and Creative Industries
 Chinese
 Convergent Media and Communication Technology
 Corporate Governance and Compliance
 Data Science and Business Intelligence
 English
 Financial Analysis
 Human Resource Management
 Journalism and Communication Concentrations in – Business Journalism – Corporate Communication
 Management
 Management Science and Information Management
 Supply Chain Management
 Translation with Business

Postgraduate Programmes

 Master of Arts in Strategic Communication
 Master of Arts in Translation (Business and Legal)
 Master of Arts in Translation (Computer-aided Translation)
 Master of Science in Data Science and Artificial Intelligence
Master of Science in Entrepreneurial Management
 Master of Science in Global Supply Chain Management

Key Academic and Administrative Officers

See also
Hang Seng School of Commerce
List of schools in Hong Kong
Education in Hong Kong
Higher education in Hong Kong

References

External links

The Hang Seng University of Hong Kong Official Page

Hang Seng Bank
Universities in Hong Kong
Private universities in Hong Kong
Siu Lek Yuen